Pengshan District is a district of the city of Meishan, Sichuan Province, China.

Climate

References

Districts of Sichuan
Meishan